The Johnson cult, formerly misidentified as a cargo cult, was initiated on New Hanover Island in Papua New Guinea in 1964. Although initially labeled a cargo cult, it has since been characterized as “political theater”.

History
Papua New Guinea was divided into German and British territories when it was first colonized in the 1870s. Germany ruled northern New Guinea, while southern New Guinea and Papua was ruled by Britain. Soon after the Australian government took power, World War II broke out, and the islands were temporarily occupied by Japan. After the Japanese surrender, Australia assumed authority again. Pressured by the United Nations, they prepared for the territories' independence.  

The so-called "Johnson cult" started when the Lavongai people of New Hanover voted for the American President Lyndon B. Johnson in the first election of Papua and New Guinea (still separate territories) in February 1964. Although the Australian authorities explained that they could not vote for President Johnson, the Lavongais refused to change their vote. They claimed they wanted the American President to represent them in their House of Assembly, because they wanted the Americans to rule over them instead of the Australians. 

Outsiders saw the Johnson cult as a cargo cult brought on by isolation, lack of education, poor economic development, and overall lack of understanding of the modern world. Dorothy Billings, who conducted anthropological research among the alleged "cultists", revealed that the Lavongai had, by voting for Johnson, consciously engaged in a theatrical act of shaming, seeking to draw attention to what they saw as poor colonial administration by the Australian authorities. They had never intended for Johnson to become their representative.

What Billings discovered was an elaborate soap opera, a piece of political theatre and a game of high stakes. She found New Hanover to have a rich history of using play-acting and bluffing as a negotiation ploy that could be used in order to embarrass a foe. [...] In 1964, the New Hanoverans were fed up with their Australian administrators. Angry with these unpopular rulers, their real purpose was to embarrass them into giving them more aid, as development of their tiny island had been neglected for years. According to Billings, the Australian authorities responsible for overseeing the island had taken the 'cult' story at face value and were clueless as to what was motivating the islanders' 'strange' fixation on Lyndon Johnson. It was a cultural misunderstanding. [...] Ironically, the political gamesmanship of these so-called primitive, irrational islanders was so complex, subtle and unfamiliar that it went over the heads of both the Australian administrators and the world media.

The cultists did not really expect Johnson to come; what they really wanted was the knowledge of the Americans, wishing to live happily and wealthy like them. New Hanover had been neglected by its past colonial governments. They believed that while the Australians and their predecessors had used the island’s resources and the collected taxes, they had not adequately dealt with the needs of the people. America, on the other hand, had provided the islanders with food, clothing and other goods during World War II, when some of the islanders worked for them on other islands. In addition, some Lavongai viewed the election itself, which had been imposed by Australia, as another humiliation, and thus were eager at the chance to get back at their colonizers.

References

Lyndon B. Johnson
Political culture
20th century in politics
Politics of Papua and New Guinea
History of Papua New Guinea
Colonialism
1964 establishments in Papua New Guinea
Protests in Oceania
1964 protests